may refer to:

In the real world
 A Chinese zen master of the Tang dynasty named Zangetsu.

In fiction
 A technique used by Superbia in 11eyes: Tsumi to Batsu to Aganai no Shōjo.
 A sword used by the character Ichigo Kurosaki in the Bleach series.
 A Knightmare Frame mecha piloted by Kyoshiro Tohdoh in the anime Code Geass.
 A move performed by the character Hitomi in the Dead or Alive fighting game series.
 A fictional exorcist and the protagonist of Bloodstained: Curse of the Moon
 A Kamen Rider form of Takatora Kureshima in tokusatsu series, Kamen Rider Gaim.